Platnickia elegans is a species of spiders in the family Zodariidae. It is found in Chile and Argentina.

References

External links 
 Platnickia elegans at the World Spider Catalog

Zodariidae
Spiders of Argentina
Arthropods of Chile
Spiders described in 1849